Robert Braden (28 January 1934 – 15 April 2018) was an American computer scientist who played a role in the development of the Internet. His research interests included end-to-end network protocols, especially in the transport and internetwork layers.

Career

Braden received a Bachelor of Engineering Physics from Cornell University in 1957, and a Master of Science in physics from Stanford University in 1962. After graduating, he worked at Stanford and Carnegie Mellon University. He taught programming and operating systems courses at Stanford, Carnegie Mellon, and also UCLA, where he moved next.

He remained at UCLA for 18 years, 16 of them at the campus computing center. He spent 1981–1982 at the Computer Science Department of University College London. While there, he wrote the first relay system connecting the Internet with the U.K. academic X.25 network.

He joined the networking research group at the Information Sciences Institute (ISI) in 1986, and was a project leader in the Computer Networks Division. He was named an ISI Fellow in 2001.

Professional contributions
While at UCLA, Braden was responsible for attaching UCLA's IBM 360/91 supercomputer to the ARPAnet, beginning in 1970. He was active in the ARPAnet Network Working Group, contributing to the design of the File Transfer Protocol in particular.

In 1978, he became a member of the Internet Working Group, which developed TCP/IP, and began development of a TCP/IP implementation for UCLA's IBM system. The UCLA IBM software was distributed to other OS/MVS sites, and was later sold commercially.

In 1981, he was invited to join the Internet Configuration Control Board, the organization that later became the Internet Architecture Board (IAB). He later served for 13 years as a member of the IAB.

Braden had been a member of the Internet Engineering Task Force and the Internet Research Task Force since their inception. When IAB task forces were formed in 1986, he created the End-to-End Task Force, later known as the IRTF End-to-End Research Group, which he chaired and later ran as a networking community mailing list for a number of years. Among his many contributions during this period are:
 Editing the Host Requirements RFCs
 Developing the Resource Reservation Protocol
 Developing T/TCP
 Serving as co-editor of the Request for Comments (RFC) series.
 Serving with the Internet Assigned Numbers Authority
 Coordinating the DARPA research network DARTnet

Braden was a Fellow of the ACM.

External links
 Carl Malamud interviews Bob Braden, Internet Talk Radio, 29 September 1993
 Oral history interview with Robert Braden, Charles Babbage Institute, University of Minnesota
 Obituary sent to the IETF mailing list

Sources
 Gary Malkin, Who's Who in the Internet: Biographies of IAB, IESG and IRSG Members
 RFC Editor, et al., 30 Years of RFCs

References

1934 births
2018 deaths
American computer scientists
Cornell University College of Engineering alumni
Academics of University College London
Internet pioneers
Year of introduction missing